Edwin Heathcote (born London) is a writer, architect and designer. He has been the architecture and design critic of The Financial Times since 1999, and is the author of books on architecture and design.  He is the founder and editor-in-chief of online design writing archive readingdesign.org.

Since 2020 he has been the Keeper of Meaning at The Cosmic House, Charles Jencks' grade II listed former London home.

Publications 
Imre Makovecz: The Wings of the Soul, Academy Editions, 1997
Budapest: A Guide to 20th Century Architecture, Batsford, 1997
Church Builders (with Iona Spens), Academy Editions, 1997
Monument Builders, Academy Editions/John Wiley & Sons, 1998
Bank Builders, Academy Editions/John Wiley & Sons, 2000
Cinema Builders, Academy Editions/John Wiley & Sons, 2001
Theatre: London: An Architectural Guide, Batsford 2002
Furniture & Architecture (editor), Architectural Design, Academy Editions/John Wiley & Sons, 2002
London Caffs, Academy Editions/John Wiley & Sons, 2004
Contemporary Church Architecture, Academy Editions/John Wiley & Sons, 2007
The Architecture of Hope, Frances Lincoln, 2010
The Meaning of Home, Frances Lincoln, 2012
On the Street: In-Between Architecture, HENI 2022

References

1968 births
Living people
English architecture writers
Architecture critics
Architects from London